"Come Over" is a song by American recording artist Faith Evans. It was written by Evans and Floyd Howard and produced by Sean Combs and Chucky Thompson for her debut studio album Faith (1995). Released as the album's fourth and final single in 1996, the song reached number 56 on the Hot R&B/Hip-Hop Songs chart and "Bubbled Under" the Billboard Hot 100 at #109.

Charts

References

1995 singles
Bad Boy Records singles
Faith Evans songs
1995 songs
Songs written by Faith Evans